The Show-Me State Games (SMSG) is an Olympic-style competition for amateur athletes in the U.S. state of Missouri, held in the city of Columbia.

The SMSG is the largest state games in the United States. The SMSG is a member of the National Congress of State Games and the United States Olympic Committee. SMSG is a program of the Missouri Governor's Council on Physical Fitness and Health, . The name derives from the state's official nickname, the "Show-Me State."

The Show-Me State Games has expanded from 600 participants in 1985, to more than 34,000 year-round participants in 2014.  In addition to three weekends in the summer, the Show-Me STATE GAMES hosts events throughout the year, including basketball tournaments, soccer events and a statewide Torch Run.  The mission of the SMSG is to provide all Missourians the opportunity to take part in an event of health, fitness, family and fun.

References

External links
Official website

1985 establishments in Missouri
Multi-sport events in the United States
Recurring sporting events established in 1985
Sports in Missouri
Tourist attractions in Columbia, Missouri
Events in Columbia, Missouri
Sports competitions in Missouri
Sports in Columbia, Missouri